177 or variation may refer to:

In general
 177 (number), a number in the 100s range
 177 AD, a year of the Common Era
 177 BC, a year Before the Common Era

Places
 Highway 177; see List of highways numbered 177
 177 Irma, a main-belt asteroid, the 177th asteroid registered
 177P/Barnard, a comet, the 177th periodic comet registered
 177th meridian west
 177th meridian east
 Pennsylvania House of Representatives, District 177, Pennsylvania, USA

Military units

 No. 177 Squadron RAF, British air force squadron
 177th Fighter Wing, New Jersey Air National Guard, USA
 177th Airlift Squadron, North Dakota air National Guard, USA
 177th Information Warfare Aggressor Squadron, Kansas Air National Guard, USA
 177th Armored Brigade (United States), United States Army Reserve
 177th Military Police Brigade (United States), United States Army

 177th Fighter Aviation Regiment PVO, a WWII Soviet fighter squadron
 177th Field Regiment, Royal Artillery, a WWII British Royal Artillery unit
 177 Field Battery, Royal Artillery, a WWII British Royal Artillery battery
 177 Heavy Battery, Royal Artillery, an interwar British Royal Artillery unit
 177th Tunnelling Company, a WWI British Royal Engineers unit
 177th (2/1st Lincoln and Leicester) Brigade, a WWI British Army unit
 177th Battalion (Simcoe Foresters), CEF, Canada; a WWI infantry battalion
 177th (Fincastle's Horse) Company, Imperial Yeomanry, a Boer War British Army unit
 177th Ohio Infantry Regiment, Union Army, USA; during the American Civil War
 177th New York Infantry Regiment, Union Army, USA; during the American Civil War

Vehicles
 Alfa Romeo 177, a 1979 Formula One racecar
 Aston Martin One-77, a car
 Cessna 177 "Cardinal", a single-engine high-wing general-aviation airplane
 Peugeot Type 177, a 1920s French car
 Vickers 177, a British interwar biplane single-seat fighter-plane
 177 (ship), ships numbered 177

Other uses
 .177 caliber (4.5mm), a calibre used for BB and pellets, also for hunting and competition shooting
 Radical 177, Han character fragment for leather
 Deutschlandfunk Kultur (AM 177 kHz), a German radio station

See also

 
 17 (disambiguation)
 A177 (disambiguation)
 I-177 (disambiguation)
 NA-177 (disambiguation)
 SR177 (disambiguation)
 177th meridian (disambiguation)